The 1998 Philadelphia Phillies season was the 116th season in the history of the franchise.

Regular season
The first game of the Phillies season was an unforgettable opening day game at Shea Stadium against their division rival New York Mets. Both of them were involved in the longest scoreless opening day game in the National League and the longest one in the MLB since 1926 when the Washington Senators beat the Philadelphia Athletics 1–0 in 15 innings. However, the Phillies lost the game 1–0 in 14 innings when Mets backup catcher Alberto Castillo delivered a full-count, two-out, pinch-hit single to right with the bases loaded off Philadelphia closer Ricky Bottalico. This was the first regular season baseball game played in New York in March.

Season standings

Record vs. opponents

Transactions
February 24, 1998: Midre Cummings was released by the Philadelphia Phillies.
June 2, 1998: Pat Burrell was drafted by the Philadelphia Phillies in the 1st round (1st pick) of the 1998 amateur draft. Player signed July 24, 1998.
June 24, 1998: Rex Hudler was released by the Philadelphia Phillies.
August 14, 1998: Paul Byrd was selected off waivers by the Philadelphia Phillies from the Atlanta Braves.

Roster

Player stats

Batting

Starters by position
Note: Pos = Position; G = Games played; AB = At bats; H = Hits; Avg. = Batting average; HR = Home runs; RBI = Runs batted in

Other batters
Note: G = Games played; AB = At bats; H = Hits; Avg. = Batting average; HR = Home runs; RBI = Runs batted in

Pitching

Starting pitchers 
Note: G = Games pitched; IP = Innings pitched; W = Wins; L = Losses; ERA = Earned run average; SO = Strikeouts

Other pitchers 
Note: G = Games pitched; IP = Innings pitched; W = Wins; L = Losses; ERA = Earned run average; SO = Strikeouts

Relief pitchers 
Note: G = Games pitched; W = Wins; L = Losses; SV = Saves; ERA = Earned run average; SO = Strikeouts

1998 Game Log

|- style="background:#fbb"
| 1 || March 31 || @ Mets || 0–1 (14) || Turk Wendell (1–0) || Ricky Bottalico (0–1) || None || 49,142 || 0–1
|-

|- style="background:#bfb"
| 2 || April 2 || @ Mets || 6–5 || Mark Portugal (1–0) || Al Leiter (0–1) || Ricky Bottalico (1) || 13,591 || 1–1
|- style="background:#fbb"
| 3 || April 3 || @ Braves || 1–5 || Denny Neagle (1–0) || Mike Grace (0–1) || None || 30,020 || 1–2
|- style="background:#fbb"
| 4 || April 4 || @ Braves || 4–5 || Dennis Martínez (1–0) || Billy Brewer (0–1) || Mark Wohlers (1) || 39,154 || 1–3
|- style="background:#bfb"
| 5 || April 5 || @ Braves || 2–1 || Curt Schilling (1–0) || Greg Maddux (0–1) || None || 35,331 || 2–3
|- style="background:#bfb"
| 6 || April 7 || Marlins || 9–8 (10) || Ricky Bottalico (1–1) || Jesús Sánchez (0–1) || None || 41,158 || 3–3
|- style="background:#bfb"
| 7 || April 8 || Marlins || 9–5 || Mike Grace (1–1) || Eric Ludwick (0–2) || None || 11,769 || 4–3
|- style="background:#bbb"
| – || April 9 || Marlins || colspan=6 | Postponed (rain); Makeup: July 24 as a traditional double-header
|- style="background:#bfb"
| 8 || April 10 || Braves || 1–0 || Curt Schilling (2–0) || Mike Cather (0–1) || None || 30,311 || 5–3
|- style="background:#bfb"
| 9 || April 11 || Braves || 6–5 || Tyler Green (1–0) || Dennis Martínez (1–1) || None || 17,676 || 6–3
|- style="background:#fbb"
| 10 || April 12 || Braves || 2–3 || Tom Glavine (2–0) || Garrett Stephenson (0–1) || Mark Wohlers (3) || 18,760 || 6–4
|- style="background:#bfb"
| 11 || April 13 || Braves || 11–8 || Jerry Spradlin (1–0) || Kerry Ligtenberg (1–1) || Ricky Bottalico (2) || 15,101 || 7–4
|- style="background:#bbb"
| – || April 14 || @ Marlins || colspan=6 | Postponed (rain); Makeup: September 26 as a traditional double-header
|- style="background:#fbb"
| 12 || April 15 || @ Marlins || 2–3 || Brian Meadows (1–2) || Curt Schilling (2–1) || Félix Heredia (1) || 23,008 || 7–5
|- style="background:#fbb"
| 13 || April 16 || @ Marlins || 4–12 || Liván Hernández (2–1) || Tyler Green (1–1) || None || 16,708 || 7–6
|- style="background:#fbb"
| 14 || April 17 || @ Cardinals || 5–8 || Cliff Politte (2–0) || Matt Whiteside (0–1) || Kent Bottenfield (3) || 33,995 || 7–7
|- style="background:#fbb"
| 15 || April 18 || @ Cardinals || 5–6 || Manny Aybar (2–2) || Mike Grace (1–2) || Jeff Brantley (3) || 38,848 || 7–8
|- style="background:#fbb"
| 16 || April 19 || @ Cardinals || 2–3 || Kent Mercker (2–0) || Matt Beech (0–1) || Juan Acevedo (1) || 36,819 || 7–9
|- style="background:#fbb"
| 17 || April 21 || Reds || 3–6 || Brett Tomko (3–1) || Curt Schilling (2–2) || Jeff Shaw (6) || 13,452 || 7–10
|- style="background:#bfb"
| 18 || April 22 || Reds || 5–4 || Tyler Green (2–1) || Gabe White (0–3) || Ricky Bottalico (3) || 11,102 || 8–10
|- style="background:#bfb"
| 19 || April 23 || Reds || 6–3 || Jerry Spradlin (2–0) || Scott Sullivan (0–2) || Mark Leiter (1) || 10,445 || 9–10
|- style="background:#bfb"
| 20 || April 24 || Cardinals || 8–4 || Matt Whiteside (1–1) || Kent Mercker (2–1) || None || 15,208 || 10–10
|- style="background:#fbb"
| 21 || April 25 || Cardinals || 5–8 || Mark Petkovsek (1–0) || Jerry Spradlin (2–1) || Jeff Brantley (5) || 22,777 || 10–11
|- style="background:#bfb"
| 22 || April 26 || Cardinals || 9–3 || Curt Schilling (3–2) || Todd Stottlemyre (3–1) || None || 27,917 || 11–11
|- style="background:#fbb"
| 23 || April 27 || @ Reds || 1–3 || Stan Belinda (1–2) || Tyler Green (2–2) || None || 13,889 || 11–12
|- style="background:#bfb"
| 24 || April 28 || @ Reds || 11–8 (10) || Mark Leiter (1–0) || Stan Belinda (1–3) || Darrin Winston (1) || 15,890 || 12–12
|- style="background:#fbb"
| 25 || April 29 || @ Reds || 0–1 || Pete Harnisch (2–0) || Mike Grace (1–3) || None || 16,411 || 12–13
|-

|- style="background:#fbb"
| 26 || May 1 || Astros || 5–12 || Shane Reynolds (2–2) || Matt Beech (0–2) || None || 11,410 || 12–14
|- style="background:#fbb"
| 27 || May 2 || Astros || 1–4 || Mike Hampton (5–0) || Curt Schilling (3–3) || Billy Wagner (7) || 18,766 || 12–15
|- style="background:#bfb"
| 28 || May 3 || Astros || 5–3 || Wayne Gomes (1–0) || Sean Bergman (2–2) || Mark Leiter (2) || 21,288 || 13–15
|- style="background:#fbb"
| 29 || May 4 || Rockies || 2–11 || John Thomson (2–2) || Garrett Stephenson (0–2) || None || 11,403 || 13–16
|- style="background:#fbb"
| 30 || May 5 || Rockies || 1–6 || Darryl Kile (4–3) || Mike Grace (1–4) || None || 13,672 || 13–17
|- style="background:#bfb"
| 31 || May 6 || Rockies || 7–6 (10) || Mark Leiter (2–0) || Chuck McElroy (0–1) || None || 19,538 || 14–17
|- style="background:#bfb"
| 32 || May 7 || Diamondbacks || 4–1 || Curt Schilling (4–3) || Andy Benes (2–3) || Mark Leiter (3) || 13,838 || 15–17
|- style="background:#bfb"
| 33 || May 8 || Diamondbacks || 6–4 || Tyler Green (3–2) || Gregg Olson (1–2) || Mark Leiter (4) || 13,259 || 16–17
|- style="background:#bbb"
| – || May 9 || Diamondbacks || colspan=6 | Postponed (rain); Makeup: August 20 as a traditional double-header
|- style="background:#bfb"
| 34 || May 10 || Diamondbacks || 7–4 || Darrin Winston (1–0) || Jeff Suppan (0–4) || Mark Leiter (5) || 18,520 || 17–17
|- style="background:#bfb"
| 35 || May 11 || @ Dodgers || 5–2 || Matt Beech (1–2) || Darren Dreifort (0–4) || Mark Leiter (6) || 25,992 || 18–17
|- style="background:#bfb"
| 36 || May 12 || @ Dodgers || 5–3 || Curt Schilling (5–3) || Scott Radinsky (1–1) || Mark Leiter (7) || 32,382 || 19–17
|- style="background:#fbb"
| 37 || May 13 || @ Dodgers || 4–9 || Chan Ho Park (4–1) || Tyler Green (3–3) || None || 28,604 || 19–18
|- style="background:#bfb"
| 38 || May 14 || @ Dodgers || 4–0 || Mark Portugal (2–0) || Hideo Nomo (2–5) || None || 30,867 || 20–18
|- style="background:#fbb"
| 39 || May 15 || @ Padres || 6–7 || Brian Boehringer (5–1) || Mike Grace (1–5) || Trevor Hoffman (12) || 25,157 || 20–19
|- style="background:#fbb"
| 40 || May 16 || @ Padres || 2–3 || Carlos Reyes (2–1) || Mark Leiter (2–1) || None || 53,117 || 20–20
|- style="background:#fbb"
| 41 || May 17 || @ Padres || 1–3 || Donne Wall (1–1) || Curt Schilling (5–4) || Trevor Hoffman (13) || 27,913 || 20–21
|- style="background:#fbb"
| 42 || May 19 || Cardinals || 8–10 || John Frascatore (1–2) || Wayne Gomes (1–1) || Juan Acevedo (2) || 16,541 || 20–22
|- style="background:#fbb"
| 43 || May 20 || Cardinals || 5–8 || Mike Busby (5–0) || Mark Portugal (2–1) || Jeff Brantley (7) || 21,347 || 20–23
|- style="background:#bfb"
| 44 || May 21 || Cardinals || 4–3 || Mike Grace (2–5) || Todd Stottlemyre (5–4) || Mark Leiter (8) || 22,706 || 21–23
|- style="background:#bfb"
| 45 || May 22 || @ Expos || 7–5 (10) || Wayne Gomes (2–1) || Anthony Telford (2–2) || Mark Leiter (9) || 11,588 || 22–23
|- style="background:#fbb"
| 46 || May 23 || @ Expos || 2–3 || Ugueth Urbina (3–1) || Curt Schilling (5–5) || None || 15,663 || 22–24
|- style="background:#fbb"
| 47 || May 24 || @ Expos || 4–5 || Carlos Pérez (4–3) || Jerry Spradlin (2–2) || Ugueth Urbina (11) || 14,164 || 22–25
|- style="background:#bfb"
| 48 || May 25 || @ Expos || 5–3 (14) || Wayne Gomes (3–1) || Shayne Bennett (1–3) || Jerry Spradlin (1) || 9,621 || 23–25
|- style="background:#bfb"
| 49 || May 27 || @ Cubs || 10–5 || Mike Grace (3–5) || Geremi González (3–5) || None || 19,354 || 24–25
|- style="background:#bfb"
| 50 || May 28 || @ Cubs || 8–7 || Darrin Winston (2–0) || Rod Beck (1–1) || Mark Leiter (10) || 25,285 || 25–25
|- style="background:#fbb"
| 51 || May 29 || Mets || 0–11 || Rick Reed (6–2) || Matt Beech (1–3) || None || 21,567 || 25–26
|- style="background:#fbb"
| 52 || May 30 || Mets || 4–6 || Al Leiter (5–3) || Tyler Green (3–4) || John Franco (11) || 30,660 || 25–27
|- style="background:#fbb"
| 53 || May 31 || Mets || 6–8 || Mel Rojas (3–0) || Darrin Winston (2–1) || John Franco (12) || 23,025 || 25–28
|-

|- style="background:#bfb"
| 54 || June 1 || Expos || 6–2 || Wayne Gomes (4–1) || Mike Maddux (1–2) || None || 16,704 || 26–28
|- style="background:#fbb"
| 55 || June 2 || Expos || 3–4 || Carl Pavano (1–0) || Curt Schilling (5–6) || Ugueth Urbina (13) || 13,606 || 26–29
|- style="background:#fbb"
| 56 || June 3 || Expos || 2–3 || Carlos Pérez (6–3) || Wayne Gomes (4–2) || None || 13,592 || 26–30
|- style="background:#bfb"
| 57 || June 5 || @ Blue Jays || 8–7 || Tyler Green (4–4) || Bill Risley (0–3) || Mark Leiter (11) || 31,176 || 27–30
|- style="background:#bfb"
| 58 || June 6 || @ Blue Jays || 10–6 || Wayne Gomes (5–2) || Juan Guzmán (3–7) || None || 30,102 || 28–30
|- style="background:#fbb"
| 59 || June 7 || @ Blue Jays || 1–3 || Chris Carpenter (2–2) || Curt Schilling (5–7) || Randy Myers (15) || 26,236 || 28–31
|- style="background:#fbb"
| 60 || June 8 || Orioles || 8–14 || Arthur Rhodes (3–2) || Darrin Winston (2–2) || Jesse Orosco (4) || 26,742 || 28–32
|- style="background:#bfb"
| 61 || June 9 || Orioles || 2–0 || Matt Beech (2–3) || Sidney Ponson (0–4) || Mark Leiter (12) || 27,602 || 29–32
|- style="background:#fbb"
| 62 || June 10 || Orioles || 2–5 (10) || Armando Benítez (2–1) || Mark Leiter (2–2) || None || 27,326 || 29–33
|- style="background:#bfb"
| 63 || June 12 || Cubs || 4–0 || Curt Schilling (6–7) || Kevin Tapani (8–4) || None || 15,489 || 30–33
|- style="background:#fbb"
| 64 || June 13 || Cubs || 8–10 (10) || Terry Adams (5–3) || Jerry Spradlin (2–3) || None || 17,115 || 30–34
|- style="background:#bfb"
| 65 || June 14 || Cubs || 4–2 || Carlton Loewer (1–0) || Mark Clark (4–7) || None || 25,543 || 31–34
|- style="background:#bfb"
| 66 || June 15 || Pirates || 2–1 || Matt Beech (3–3) || Jon Lieber (4–8) || Mark Leiter (13) || 14,411 || 32–34
|- style="background:#bfb"
| 67 || June 16 || Pirates || 8–7 || Robert Dodd (1–0) || Rich Loiselle (1–5) || None || 24,615 || 33–34
|- style="background:#bfb"
| 68 || June 17 || Pirates || 3–1 || Curt Schilling (7–7) || Francisco Córdova (6–5) || None || 25,694 || 34–34
|- style="background:#fbb"
| 69 || June 18 || @ Cubs || 5–12 || Geremi González (6–5) || Mark Portugal (2–2) || Terry Mulholland (2) || 21,267 || 34–35
|- style="background:#bfb"
| 70 || June 19 || @ Cubs || 9–8 (12) || Jerry Spradlin (3–3) || Terry Mulholland (2–2) || None || 39,592 || 35–35
|- style="background:#fbb"
| 71 || June 20 || @ Cubs || 4–9 || Kerry Wood (7–3) || Matt Beech (3–4) || None || 39,761 || 35–36
|- style="background:#bfb"
| 72 || June 21 || @ Cubs || 7–2 || Tyler Green (5–4) || Steve Trachsel (6–4) || None || 38,437 || 36–36
|- style="background:#bfb"
| 73 || June 22 || @ Red Sox || 9–8 (10) || Wayne Gomes (6–2) || Tom Gordon (4–2) || Mark Leiter (14) || 33,592 || 37–36
|- style="background:#bfb"
| 74 || June 23 || @ Red Sox || 3–2 || Mark Portugal (3–2) || Derek Lowe (0–6) || None || 33,212 || 38–36
|- style="background:#bfb"
| 75 || June 24 || Red Sox || 11–8 || Carlton Loewer (2–0) || Steve Avery (4–2) || Mark Leiter (15) || 28,079 || 39–36
|- style="background:#fbb"
| 76 || June 25 || Red Sox || 5–7 || Bret Saberhagen (9–5) || Matt Beech (3–5) || Ron Mahay (1) || 28,263 || 39–37
|- style="background:#bfb"
| 77 || June 26 || Devil Rays || 7–0 || Tyler Green (6–4) || Jason Johnson (2–5) || None || 17,559 || 40–37
|- style="background:#fbb"
| 78 || June 27 || Devil Rays || 1–5 || Rolando Arrojo (10–4) || Curt Schilling (7–8) || None || 44,262 || 40–38
|- style="background:#fbb"
| 79 || June 28 || Devil Rays || 4–5 || Albie Lopez (4–2) || Wayne Gomes (6–3) || Roberto Hernández (17) || 25,157 || 40–39
|- style="background:#fbb"
| 80 || June 30 || @ Yankees || 2–9 || David Cone (11–2) || Carlton Loewer (2–1) || None || 29,087 || 40–40
|-

|- style="background:#fbb"
| 81 || July 1 || @ Yankees || 2–5 || David Wells (11–2) || Matt Beech (3–6) || Mariano Rivera (20) || 28,919 || 40–41
|- style="background:#fbb"
| 82 || July 2 || @ Yankees || 8–9 (11) || Mike Buddie (3–0) || Jerry Spradlin (3–4) || None || 31,259 || 40–42
|- style="background:#bfb"
| 83 || July 3 || Brewers || 2–0 || Curt Schilling (8–8) || Scott Karl (6–4) || Mark Leiter (16) || 55,393 || 41–42
|- style="background:#bfb"
| 84 || July 4 || Brewers || 6–5 || Wayne Gomes (7–3) || Bob Wickman (3–5) || None || 35,596 || 42–42
|- style="background:#bfb"
| 85 || July 5 || Brewers || 4–3 || Carlton Loewer (3–1) || Cal Eldred (4–6) || Mark Leiter (17) || 20,116 || 43–42
|- style="background:#bbcaff;"
| – || July 7 ||colspan="7" |1998 Major League Baseball All-Star Game at Coors Field in Denver
|- style="background:#bfb"
| 86 || July 10 || @ Pirates || 7–6 || Curt Schilling (9–8) || Francisco Córdova (6–8) || None || 18,665 || 44–42
|- style="background:#bfb"
| 87 || July 11 || @ Pirates || 1–0 || Mark Portugal (4–2) || Rich Loiselle (1–7) || Mark Leiter (18) || 30,084 || 45–42
|- style="background:#bfb"
| 88 || July 12 || @ Pirates || 10–4 || Carlton Loewer (4–1) || Esteban Loaiza (6–5) || None || 34,144 || 46–42
|- style="background:#fbb"
| 89 || July 13 || @ Brewers || 2–4 || Steve Woodard (6–5) || Tyler Green (6–5) || Bob Wickman (13) || 17,230 || 46–43
|- style="background:#bfb"
| 90 || July 14 || @ Brewers || 4–2 || Wayne Gomes (8–3) || Jeff Juden (7–8) || Mark Leiter (19) || 16,861 || 47–43
|- style="background:#fbb"
| 91 || July 15 || @ Brewers || 2–3 || Scott Karl (7–4) || Curt Schilling (9–9) || Bob Wickman (14) || 20,554 || 47–44
|- style="background:#bfb"
| 92 || July 16 || @ Mets || 4–2 || Mark Portugal (5–2) || Rick Reed (10–6) || Mark Leiter (20) || 20,283 || 48–44
|- style="background:#fbb"
| 93 || July 17 || @ Mets || 0–6 || Hideo Nomo (3–8) || Carlton Loewer (4–2) || None || 23,298 || 48–45
|- style="background:#fbb"
| 94 || July 18 || @ Mets || 0–7 || Al Leiter (10–4) || Tyler Green (6–6) || None || 37,208 || 48–46
|- style="background:#bfb"
| 95 || July 19 || @ Mets || 7–6 (10) || Mark Leiter (3–2) || Dennis Cook (4–3) || None || 29,520 || 49–46
|- style="background:#bfb"
| 96 || July 20 || @ Expos || 3–1 || Curt Schilling (10–9) || Carlos Pérez (7–10) || None || 9,792 || 50–46
|- style="background:#bfb"
| 97 || July 21 || @ Expos || 3–2 || Mark Portugal (6–2) || Carl Pavano (3–4) || None || 10,816 || 51–46
|- style="background:#fbb"
| 98 || July 22 || Braves || 2–14 || Tom Glavine (14–4) || Carlton Loewer (4–3) || None || 28,304 || 51–47
|- style="background:#fbb"
| 99 || July 23 || Braves || 2–3 || Kevin Millwood (11–5) || Tyler Green (6–7) || Kerry Ligtenberg (12) || 28,222 || 51–48
|- style="background:#bfb"
| 100 || July 24 (1) || Marlins || 6–4 (12) || Wayne Gomes (9–3) || Antonio Alfonseca (2–4) || None || see 2nd game || 52–48
|- style="background:#bfb"
| 101 || July 24 (2) || Marlins || 7–6 (12) || Mark Leiter (4–2) || Vic Darensbourg (0–7) || None || 30,622 || 53–48
|- style="background:#fbb"
| 102 || July 25 || Marlins || 4–5 || Liván Hernández (8–7) || Curt Schilling (10–10) || Matt Mantei (4) || 21,038 || 53–49
|- style="background:#bfb"
| 103 || July 26 || Marlins || 10–9 || Mark Leiter (5–2) || Antonio Alfonseca (2–5) || None || 27,944 || 54–49
|- style="background:#fbb"
| 104 || July 28 || Dodgers || 3–7 || Brian Bohanon (4–6) || Tyler Green (6–8) || None || 24,828 || 54–50
|- style="background:#bfb"
| 105 || July 29 || Dodgers || 8–3 || Carlton Loewer (5–3) || Dave Mlicki (5–5) || None || 20,127 || 55–50
|- style="background:#fbb"
| 106 || July 30 || Dodgers || 1–3 || Chan Ho Park (10–5) || Matt Beech (3–7) || Jeff Shaw (31) || 22,890 || 55–51
|- style="background:#fbb"
| 107 || July 31 || Giants || 6–7 || José Mesa (5–4) || Yorkis Pérez (0–1) || Robb Nen (28) || 21,763 || 55–52
|-

|- style="background:#fbb"
| 108 || August 1 || Giants || 7–8 (10) || Robb Nen (7–2) || Ricky Bottalico (1–2) || Rich Rodriguez (2) || 24,452 || 55–53
|- style="background:#fbb"
| 109 || August 2 || Giants || 3–15 || Kirk Rueter (12–6) || Mike Welch (0–1) || None || 27,668 || 55–54
|- style="background:#fbb"
| 110 || August 3 || Giants || 1–6 || Danny Darwin (7–9) || Carlton Loewer (5–4) || None || 31,080 || 55–55
|- style="background:#fbb"
| 111 || August 4 || @ Padres || 1–3 || Sterling Hitchcock (5–4) || Matt Beech (3–8) || Trevor Hoffman (37) || 22,125 || 55–56
|- style="background:#fbb"
| 112 || August 5 || @ Padres || 0–4 || Kevin Brown (14–3) || Curt Schilling (10–11) || None || 19,109 || 55–57
|- style="background:#bfb"
| 113 || August 6 || @ Padres || 3–2 (11) || Mark Leiter (6–2) || Trevor Hoffman (3–1) || None || 19,007 || 56–57
|- style="background:#fbb"
| 114 || August 7 || @ Astros || 0–9 || Randy Johnson (11–10) || Mike Welch (0–2) || None || 52,071 || 56–58
|- style="background:#fbb"
| 115 || August 8 || @ Astros || 6–7 || Doug Henry (8–2) || Mark Leiter (6–3) || None || 42,523 || 56–59
|- style="background:#fbb"
| 116 || August 9 || @ Astros || 2–11 || Shane Reynolds (14–7) || Matt Beech (3–9) || None || 28,651 || 56–60
|- style="background:#bfb"
| 117 || August 10 || @ Diamondbacks || 3–0 || Curt Schilling (11–11) || Omar Daal (5–7) || None || 41,711 || 57–60
|- style="background:#fbb"
| 118 || August 11 || @ Diamondbacks || 3–7 || Andy Benes (10–11) || Mark Portugal (6–3) || None || 41,298 || 57–61
|- style="background:#bfb"
| 119 || August 12 || @ Diamondbacks || 7–4 || Mike Grace (4–5) || Brian Anderson (8–11) || Mark Leiter (21) || 41,510 || 58–61
|- style="background:#bfb"
| 120 || August 14 || @ Rockies || 6–2 || Carlton Loewer (6–4) || Bobby M. Jones (5–6) || None || 47,395 || 59–61
|- style="background:#fbb"
| 121 || August 15 || @ Rockies || 3–7 || Darryl Kile (9–14) || Wayne Gomes (9–4) || None || 48,329 || 59–62
|- style="background:#bfb"
| 122 || August 16 || @ Rockies || 8–7 || Mark Portugal (7–3) || Jamey Wright (7–11) || Mark Leiter (22) || 48,024 || 60–62
|- style="background:#bfb"
| 123 || August 17 || Astros || 4–0 || Paul Byrd (1–0) || Randy Johnson (12–11) || None || 18,975 || 61–62
|- style="background:#fbb"
| 124 || August 18 || Astros || 2–8 || José Lima (12–6) || Mike Grace (4–6) || None || 17,541 || 61–63
|- style="background:#fbb"
| 125 || August 19 || Astros || 3–4 || Shane Reynolds (15–8) || Mark Leiter (6–4) || Billy Wagner (24) || 21,341 || 61–64
|- style="background:#bfb"
| 126 || August 20 (1) || Diamondbacks || 11–1 || Curt Schilling (12–11) || Bob Wolcott (1–3) || None || see 2nd game  || 62–64
|- style="background:#fbb"
| 127 || August 20 (2) || Diamondbacks || 9–12 (11) || Alan Embree (4–0) || Ricky Bottalico (1–3) || None || 26,216 || 62–65
|- style="background:#bfb"
| 128 || August 21 || Diamondbacks || 1–0 || Mark Portugal (8–3) || Omar Daal (6–8) || Wayne Gomes (1) || 17,144 || 63–65
|- style="background:#bfb"
| 129 || August 22 || Rockies || 6–1 || Paul Byrd (2–0) || Pedro Astacio (11–13) || None || 23,435 || 64–65
|- style="background:#fbb"
| 130 || August 23 || Rockies || 2–5 || John Thomson (8–8) || Mike Grace (4–7) || Jerry Dipoto (16) || 26,364 || 64–66
|- style="background:#fbb"
| 131 || August 24 || Rockies || 1–3 || Bobby M. Jones (6–7) || Carlton Loewer (6–5) || Dave Veres (5) || 15,665 || 64–67
|- style="background:#fbb"
| 132 || August 25 || Padres || 3–5 || Kevin Brown (17–4) || Curt Schilling (12–12) || Trevor Hoffman (42) || 18,100 || 64–68
|- style="background:#fbb"
| 133 || August 26 || Padres || 0–2 || Joey Hamilton (11–11) || Mark Portugal (8–4) || Trevor Hoffman (43) || 15,656 || 64–69
|- style="background:#fbb"
| 134 || August 27 || Padres || 1–8 || Stan Spencer (1–0) || Paul Byrd (2–1) || None || 23,371 || 64–70
|- style="background:#bfb"
| 135 || August 28 || @ Giants || 4–3 (10) || Mark Leiter (7–4) || Robb Nen (7–5) || None || 14,317 || 65–70
|- style="background:#fbb"
| 136 || August 29 || @ Giants || 3–10 || Mark Gardner (11–5) || Carlton Loewer (6–6) || None || 30,147 || 65–71
|- style="background:#bfb"
| 137 || August 30 || @ Giants || 5–4 || Curt Schilling (13–12) || Russ Ortiz (2–4) || None || 36,920 || 66–71
|- style="background:#fbb"
| 138 || August 31 || @ Giants || 2–6 || José Mesa (8–6) || Wayne Gomes (9–5) || None || 13,092 || 66–72
|-

|- style="background:#fbb"
| 139 || September 1 || @ Dodgers || 2–3 || Ismael Valdez (10–9) || Paul Byrd (2–2) || Jeff Shaw (39) || 28,199 || 66–73
|- style="background:#fbb"
| 140 || September 2 || @ Dodgers || 0–6 || Carlos Pérez (8–13) || Tyler Green (6–9) || None || 32,630 || 66–74
|- style="background:#bfb"
| 141 || September 5 || @ Brewers || 6–2 || Curt Schilling (14–12) || Steve Woodard (9–10) || None || 17,160 || 67–74
|- style="background:#fbb"
| 142 || September 6 || @ Brewers || 2–3 (14) || David Weathers (5–5) || Ricky Bottalico (1–4) || None || 15,935 || 67–75
|- style="background:#fbb"
| 143 || September 7 || @ Brewers || 4–5 || David Weathers (6–5) || Wayne Gomes (9–6) || None || 17,733 || 67–76
|- style="background:#bfb"
| 144 || September 8 || Mets || 16–4 || Paul Byrd (3–2) || Hideo Nomo (6–12) || None || 18,661 || 68–76
|- style="background:#fbb"
| 145 || September 9 || Mets || 2–6 || Armando Reynoso (7–1) || Curt Schilling (14–13) || John Franco (34) || 16,193 || 68–77
|- style="background:#fbb"
| 146 || September 10 || Mets || 5–7 || Al Leiter (15–5) || Tyler Green (6–10) || John Franco (35) || 16,715 || 68–78
|- style="background:#fbb"
| 147 || September 11 || Pirates || 1–6 || Chris Peters (8–9) || Carlton Loewer (6–7) || None || 16,597 || 68–79
|- style="background:#bfb"
| 148 || September 12 || Pirates || 13–4 || Mark Portugal (9–4) || Elmer Dessens (2–4) || None || 19,329 || 69–79
|- style="background:#bfb"
| 149 || September 13 || Pirates || 4–1 || Paul Byrd (4–2) || Francisco Córdova (12–13) || Mark Leiter (23) || 19,662 || 70–79
|- style="background:#fbb"
| 150 || September 14 || @ Braves || 2–4 || Tom Glavine (19–6) || Curt Schilling (14–14) || Kerry Ligtenberg (28) || 33,367 || 70–80
|- style="background:#fbb"
| 151 || September 15 || @ Braves || 0–3 || Kevin Millwood (16–8) || Tyler Green (6–11) || Norm Charlton (1) || 35,478 || 70–81
|- style="background:#fbb"
| 152 || September 16 || @ Braves || 1–5 || John Smoltz (16–3) || Carlton Loewer (6–8) || None || 34,961 || 70–82
|- style="background:#fbb"
| 153 || September 18 || Expos || 4–11 || Javier Vázquez (5–14) || Mark Portugal (9–5) || Anthony Telford (1) || 14,811 || 70–83
|- style="background:#bfb"
| 154 || September 19 || Expos || 4–3 || Curt Schilling (15–14) || Mike Maddux (3–4) || None || 18,701 || 71–83
|- style="background:#bfb"
| 155 || September 20 || Expos || 6–3 || Paul Byrd (5–2) || Dustin Hermanson (14–11) || Ricky Bottalico (4) || 26,207 || 72–83
|- style="background:#fbb"
| 156 || September 21 || @ Reds || 5–8 || Scott Sullivan (5–5) || Mark Leiter (7–5) || Danny Graves (7) || 12,969 || 72–84
|- style="background:#bfb"
| 157 || September 22 || @ Reds || 10–8 (11) || Jerry Spradlin (4–4) || Todd Williams (0–1) || Ricky Bottalico (5) || 13,644 || 73–84
|- style="background:#bfb"
| 158 || September 23 || @ Reds || 4–2 || Mark Portugal (10–5) || Steve Parris (6–5) || Ricky Bottalico (6) || 13,376 || 74–84
|- style="background:#bbb"
| – || September 25 || @ Marlins || colspan=6 | Postponed (rain); Makeup: September 27 as a traditional double-header
|- style="background:#fbb"
| 159 || September 26 (1) || @ Marlins || 3–4 (10) || Antonio Alfonseca (4–6) || Yorkis Pérez (0–2) || None || see 2nd game || 74–85
|- style="background:#fbb"
| 160 || September 26 (2) || @ Marlins || 0–1 (13) || Rob Stanifer (2–4) || Ricky Bottalico (1–5) || None || 36,267 || 74–86
|- style="background:#fbb"
| 161 || September 27 (1) || @ Marlins || 5–6 || Brian Meadows (11–13) || Tyler Green (6–12) || Antonio Alfonseca (8) || see 2nd game || 74–87
|- style="background:#bfb"
| 162 || September 27 (2) || @ Marlins || 7–3 || Carlton Loewer' (7–8) || Rafael Medina (2–6) || None'' || 37,007 || 75–87
|-

Farm system

References

1998 Philadelphia Phillies season at Baseball Reference
1998 Philadelphia Phillies at Baseball Almanac

Philadelphia Phillies seasons
Philadelphia Phillies Season, 1998
Philadelphia Phillies